Lauderdale County School District, Lauderdale County School System, or Lauderdale County Schools is a school district in Lauderdale County, Alabama. Its headquarters is in an unincorporated area near Florence.

Schools
Allen Career Technical Center
Brooks High School
Brooks Elementary
Central School
Lauderdale County High School
Lexington School
Rogers School
Underwood Elementary
Waterloo High School
Wilson High School

References

External links
 

School districts in Alabama
Education in Lauderdale County, Alabama